Salmon Fletcher Dutton (July 7, 1870–December 2, 1931) was an American businessman, Lieutenant colonel in World War I, and owner of the Dutton house, one of the original homes on Carmel Point at the southern city limits of Carmel-by-the-Sea, California. He was one of the original members of the Abalone League in the 1920s.

Early life 

Dutton was born on July 7, 1870, in Cavendish, Vermont. His father was postmaster Richard Henry Dutton (1833-1891), and his mother was Helen Louise Wood (1850-). He was raised in New England. The settlement Duttonsville, was named after his gg grandfather Salmon Dutton (1744-1824) in the early 1780s. In the 1920s, the name was still being used as the official name of the Cavendish village schools.

Dutton entered the military service during the Spanish–American War in 1898. He served as commissary with the 3rd Brigade, 1st Division, 3rd Corps, in Georgia and Alabama, and was with the United States Forces of Occupation in Cuba from January to May 1899. He was commissioned a Captain during the war by a senatorial appointment from his uncle, governor Redfield Proctor Jr., of Vermont.

He married Laura May Chase of Charlestown, New Hampshire on September 25, 1901, in Keene, New Hampshire. Dutton was then appointed to the Regular Army in 1901. The position carried a salary of $2,000. He served in the Philippines, Denver, San Francisco, and Boston, as well as in France during World War I. His son Salmon Fletcher Dutton, Jr., was born on November 19, 1908, while stationed in Panay, Philippines. While with the American Expeditionary Forces he was Quartermaster of the 3rd Corps, serving in the Aisne-Marne, Oise-Aisne, Meuse–Argonne operations, and in the Champagne and Lorraine defensive during the campaigns in World War I.

Professional background

He was a former druggist at the drug firm of Aldrich & Dutton, in Keene, New Hampshire in the early 1900s.

Dutton and his family moved from the East Coast to San Francisco, California in 1920. After his aunt, Emily Jane Dutton (1835-1915) died, Dutton received a benefit from her trust estate in July 1923.

Dutton House

Dutton and his family moved to Carmel-by-the-Sea by the early 1920s. On June 15, 1923, at age 52 and retired, he applied for a United States passport. His friend, Carmel photographer Lewis Josselyn, identified him in the passport application as a friend who he had known for the past nine years. The passport also listed his address as the Highlands Inn, in Carmel, California. Dutton travelled by ship on the SS Montlaurier, to Great Britain, France, Belgium, Italy, Switzerland, and Spain with his son. They returned on the SS Zeeland, on September 9, 1923 via Cherbourg, France to New York City.

Dutton built a large two-story house on the rocky coastline on Scenic Road, Carmel Point, at the southern city limits of Carmel-by-the-Sea, California. The house was referred to as "The Warehouse," and "The Castle" by his neighbor Robinson Jeffers. It was a stone house with large iron doors to the west of the "Sea Road," (Scenic Road) which at the time was a dirt road that was marked by driftwood stakes on both sides of the road. The house was between the Kuster's house and the Jeffer's house.

By 1920, the only homes on Carmel Point were the homes of Florence Wells's Driftwood Cottage (1908); John Fleming Wilson's Cottage (1912); Little Cottage of River Winds designed by Julia Morgan (1915); Col. Dutton's "Warehouse" (ca. 1919); poet Robinson Jeffers and his wife Una (1919); Playwright Charles King Van Riper (1920); musician, and attorney Edward G. Kuster (1920); and George W. Reamer's House (1920s).

The Dutton house was remodeled in 1953 for Mrs. Gladys Hosking by Francis W. Wynkoop. It was the second house built by Wynkoop on the Carmel Point coastline, called The Seaburst House or the Henry Johnson House. It is a mid-century modern Expressionist-style house at 26200 Scenic Road, and was influenced by Frank Lloyd Wright's organic architecture style.

Wynkoop and his family moved to Carmel-by-the-Sea in the early 1950s. He designed two houses on Carmel Point. The first house was the Butterfly House built in 1951, at 26320 Scenic Road. It was Wynkoop's own residence for several years.

Abalone League

The Abalone League was a Carmel focal point for many years. In the 1920s, Dutton became close friends with group players that included writers Jimmie Hopper Bob Pinkerton, and Harry Leon Wilson; actors Frank Sheridan and Kit Cooke; developers of Pebble Beach Sam Morse and By Ford; theatrical producer Ted Kuster; Helen Wilson, Philip Wilson, Sr., (of the Philip Wilson Building); Elliot and Marion Boke, Col. Fletcher Dutton, Fred and Harrison Godwin (of the La Playa Hotel); Jo Mora, and Don Hale.

Dutton and his son were early players on an Abalone League together. Dutton was the team captain for the "Sardines". The players were: Gordon Campbell, c; Fred Ammerman, p; Helen Van Ripper, 1st; Col. Dutton, captain and 2nd; Fletcher Dutton Jr., 3nd; Richard Boke, ss; writer Jimmy Hooper Sr., lf; Aucourt, cf; Grace McConnell, rf; Bill Heron, if; Jim Hopper Jr., of.

In December 1927, Dutton wrote a check to the American Red Cross Flood Relief Fund in his home town of Cavendish, Vermont.

Death

Dutton died on December 2, 1931, in Carmel-by-the-Sea, California, at the age of 61. After his death, his wife applied for a US War Pension on February 23, 1932. Dutton’s wife Laura Chase Dutton, of Carmel Highlands, died by suicide on September 4, 1939.

See also
 Timeline of Carmel-by-the-Sea, California

References

External links

 The Duttons of New England

1870 births
1931 deaths
People from California
People from Vermont